Necrophila is a genus of carrion beetles, with around 20 species: most found in Asia, and one species in North America, Necrophila americana.

Species
 Necrophila americana
 Necrophila andrewesi
 Necrophila brunnicollis Necrophila cyaneocephala Necrophila cyaneocincta Necrophila cyaniventris Necrophila formosa Necrophila ioptera Necrophila jakowlewi Necrophila japonica Necrophila luciae Necrophila renatae Necrophila rufithorax Necrophila subcaudata Necrophila thibetana Necrophila viridis''

References

External links

Silphidae